Adelle Blackett  is a professor of law at McGill University Faculty of Law. Her scholarship focuses on labour law and human rights issues. She was elected a Fellow of the Royal Society of Canada in 2020 and was awarded a fellowship by the Pierre Elliott Trudeau Foundation in 2016. Blackett has served as a commissioner of the Commission des droits de la personne et des droits de la jeunesse. , she held a Canada Research Chair in transnational labour law and development.

Publications

References

External links 
 Profile at McGill University Faculty of Law
 

Canadian legal scholars
Academic staff of the McGill University Faculty of Law
Fellows of the Royal Society of Canada
Canada Research Chairs
Labour law scholars
Year of birth missing (living people)
Living people